Love Games is the debut album by Evan Rogers, singer-songwriter-producer and part of the duo of Carl Sturken and Evan Rogers. In addition to Carl Sturken's contributions, John Nevin appears on bass, who also returned in 1991 as part of the Sturken/Rogers R&B/dance-rock band Rythm Syndicate.

Track listing
All songs written by Evan Rogers and Carl Sturken (Bayjun Beat/MCA Music Publishing), except where noted.

"Hold On" 5:18
"Private Joy" (Prince; Controversy Music) 5:15
"Full-Time Lover" 5:38
"Sweet 16" 5:23
"Don't Jump to Conclusions" 4:47
"One-Track Mind" 5:04
"I'll Break the Rules for You" 4:21
"Be Mine Tonight" 5:07

Personnel
Evan Rogers: Drum Programming, Main Vocal
Carl Sturken: Guitars, Keyboards, Drum Programming, Vocal Backing
Kennan Keating, Bob Palmieri, Paul Pesco: Guitars
Charlie Roth, Mary Kessler, Robbie Kilgore: Keyboards
John Nevin, Tony Bridges: Bass
Roger Byam: Saxophone

Production
Arranged and produced by Carl Sturken and Evan Rogers
Recorded by Bob Rosa with assistance by Acar S. Key, Cathy Gazzo, Mike Nicoletti, Steve Pecorella and Kennan Keating
Mixed by Chris Lord-Alge

References

1985 debut albums
RCA Records albums
Albums produced by Carl Sturken and Evan Rogers